Allison Williams (born c. 1981) is a beauty queen from Morgantown, West Virginia who was crowned Miss West Virginia 2003. She competed in the Miss America 2004 pageant but was unplaced.

Sex tape lawsuit
Williams sued 59 defendants in countries such as the United States, Australia, South Africa, and The Netherlands for posting a sex video allegedly showing her in the back of a WVEC news van. She first discovered the video in August 2004 during her first week at law school. Her spokeswoman Lavinia Mann Cummings said, "These Web sites allege that the woman in the video is Miss West Virginia, but it's not", adding, "Some sites even had her pageant picture next to the video."

Williams won a $7.2 million verdict against nine Internet companies and individuals who tried to sell pornographic videos they falsely claimed featured her.

References

1981 births
Living people
Miss America 2004 delegates
People from Morgantown, West Virginia
West Virginia University alumni
Beauty pageant contestants from West Virginia
Place of birth missing (living people)